Oligostigmoides is a genus of moths of the family Crambidae described by William Harry Lange in 1956.

Species
Oligostigmoides cryptalis (Druce, 1896)
Oligostigmoides cuernavacalis Lange, 1956
Oligostigmoides mediocinctalis (Hampson, 1897)
Oligostigmoides peruviensis (Hampson, 1917)
Oligostigmoides profusalis (Schaus, 1912)

References

  (1956). "A generic revision of the aquatic moths of North America: (Lepidoptera: Pyralidae, Nymphulinae)". Wasman Journal of Biology. 14 (1): 59–144.

External links

Acentropinae
Crambidae genera